Franciszek Pytel (24 June 1918 – 31 December 1988) was a Polish footballer. He played in one match for the Poland national football team in 1937.

References

External links
 

1918 births
1988 deaths
Polish footballers
Poland international footballers
Place of birth missing
Association footballers not categorized by position